Catch 22: Based on the Unwritten Story by Seanie Sugrue is a 2016 United States thriller independent film. It premiered at the 2016 Palm Beach International Film Festival and would go on to play numerous others before being acquired for distribution by Toronto-based 108 Media. It was released theatrically on January 17, 2017.

Synopsis 
With Hurricane Sandy looming on the horizon, five hard-lived friends come to from a send-off celebration alongside an unexplained dead girl. What are friends for?

Cast 
 Jayce Bartok ... Vince
 Brock Harris ... Smoke
 Dónall Ó Héalaí ... Mikey
 Michael Rabe ... Seanie
 Al Thompson ... Bird
 Charmane Star ... Girl
 Phil Burke ... Dude
 Josh Folan ... Todd/Dad

References

External links 
 
 
 

2016 films
American independent films
2010s thriller films
American thriller films
2010s English-language films
2010s American films